The Old Allahabad City, at the south of Prayagraj Junction Railway Station, consists of neighborhoods like Chowk, Johnstongunj, Dariyabad, Khuldabad etc. and was in existence from the time of Akbar. Some magnificent structures erected in this era consist of the Khusro Bagh and the Allahabad Fort. In the north of Railway Station, the New Allahabad City consists of neighborhoods like Lukergunj, Civil Lines, Georgetown, Tagoretown, Bharadwaj Puram, Ashok Nagar, Mumfordgunj etc., which are relatively new and were built during the British rule. These neighborhoods reflect British architecture like the All Saints Cathedral, Alfred Park and Allahabad High Court. Newer residential areas include neighborhoods like Kareli and suburbs like Naini  Jhunsi and Manauri bajar.

Allengunj
Area close to Prayag Junction, has staff selection board office there, lots of women hostels there.

Alopibagh
Alopibagh is a locality/township of Allahabad, Uttar Pradesh, India. The locality is close to the Kumbh Mela area, the Sangam, the rivers Ganges and Yamuna, and one of the most ancient Hindu temples of India, the Alopi Devi Mandir, is also in this locality. Alopibagh is adjacent to Daraganj, the oldest suburb of Allahabad and the most important bathing Ghat on the bank of Ganges.

Atala

Attarsuiya

Bahadurgunj

Bai-Ka-Bagh

Bairahana
Bairahana is further divided into two localities:New Bairahana and the Old Bairahana. Near Bairahana chauraha is a medieval cemetery also called the "Gora Kabristan", where the dead bodies of British soldiers killed during 1857 revolt were buried.

Beli Colony

Benigunj
Benigunj is situated near to railways station.

Bharadwaj Puram
Bharadwaj Puram is a neighborhood in Allahabad in central part of the city. It is in between Tagore Town and Daraganj. It is near the major commercial centers of the city such as Katra and Civil Lines. There is a market within this locality on the Matiyara road which is very popular for shopping and dining options. There are several schools, hospitals, parks as well in this neighborhood.

Chatham Lines

Chowk
Chowk is the historic city centre of the Old Allahabad city. It is situated at southern part of Allahabad Municipal Council.1 Chowk serves as a traditional bazaar with The Grand Trunk Road running through the centre of it. Chowk is a historical point, where once stood the Neem tree where numerous freedom fighters were hanged in the first Indian War of Independence.

Civil Lines

Formerly known as Cannington and Canning Town, it is the central business district of Allahabad and is famous for its urban setting, gridiron plan roads and high rise buildings. Built in 1857, under the supervision of Cuthbert Bensley Thornhill, when around 600 Meo people were massacred by the British people in India for their alliance with the Indian Independence Movement activists and eight villages were seized to form a new township., it was the largest town-planning project carried out in India before the establishment of New Delhi.

Colonelgunj

Daraganj

Darbhanga
Dariyabad Allahabad, part of Dariyabad. On one side is Yamuna river, and on the other side Mirapur.

Dhoomangunj

Georgetown
Georgetown is a neighborhood of Allahabad, India. It is a residential area in the central part of the city mainly occupied by the white collar workers, doctors and advocates. It also houses a large number of hospitals and clinics. Georgetown is famous for is affluent surroundings and apartments. It is bordered by Kamla Nehru Road in the west, Thornhill Road, MG Marg in the south and Tagoretown in the west.
Notable landmarks located in and near the neighborhood are Alfred Park and Lowther Castle.

Govindpur

Johnstongunj

Kareli
Kareli (officially known as Kareli Scheme) is a residential neighborhood of Allahabad. Developed by Awas Vikas in 1979, it was one of the biggest planned neighborhoods in India. The neighborhood is sub divided into neighborhoods like GTB Nagar, Gaus Nagar, Allahabad, Shams Nagar, Allahabad and Rehmat Nagar Colony, Allahabad. Kareli is the second largest colony of India in terms of Area and is one of the most expensive residential localities of Allahabad. It is also known as Officer's colony by the localas as the large number of people who served as government servants like IAS, IPS, PCS, etc inhabited the place.The neighborhood was predominately occupied by the members of the mercantile middle class of Meerapur and Attarsuiya, and white collar workers from several public sector undertakings and private companies established in the new industrial region of
Naini. It was later overwhelmed by a richer population after the oil boom and privatization. However it is not mintained well. The roads have so many mudhols.

Katra

Khuldabad

Khusrobagh

Kydganj

Kalandipuram Colony

Lukergunj
Lukergunj is a posh residential area famous for its Victorian era bungalows and high-rise apartments. Lukergunj, well known for its clubbing culture, was once predominantly occupied by British and Anglo Indians. It is situated one kilometer south west from the Allahabad Railway Station.

Meerapur
Meerapur is a neighborhood/locality in Allahabad. It is mainly famous for eateries as there are many sweet shops and markets for visitors. Old temples and mosques are the main attraction. Meerapur is surrounded by the Yamuna river from one side near Bargad Ghat.

Meergunj
This neighborhood is the infamously claimed red-light district of the city. Apart from that it is also a densely populated residential area and a marketplace. It is located near Chowk.

Mumfordgunj

Muirabad

Mutthiganj

North Malaka

Pac Lines

Police Lines

Prayagraj
Prayagraj is one of the largest cities of the State of Uttar Pradesh in India. It encompasses a large area and is an inland peninsula surrounded by the rivers Ganges and Yamuna from three sides with only one side connected to the mainland. Along with a large number of areas within Prayagraj City, there are several satellite cities on the other side of the rivers Ganges and Yamuna, and are considered as satellite cities of Prayagraj. There are also a large number of Townships and Villages near Prayagraj City Within Prayagraj District. Posh pockets of the city include neighborhoods like Civil Lines, Cantonment or Allahabad Cantt, Kotwali, Dhoomanganj, Colonelganj, Mahaveer Puri, Shivkuti, Georgetown, Bharadwaj Puram, Kydgunj, and Attarsuiya.

Preetam Nagar

Rajapur

Rajrooppur

Rambagh

Rani Mandi

Sadiyapur(Nishad Nagar)

Satti Chaura

Shastri Nagar

Sohbatiabagh

South Malaka
South Malaka is a locality/township of Allahabad, Uttar Pradesh, India. It is close to the railway track connecting Allahabad to Varanasi and Gorakhpur. The other important institutions in the locality are Government Inter College and U.P.Government Central Library.

Sulem Sarai

Tagoretown

Teliyargunj

Suburbs of Allahabad
Manauri bajar
Bamrauli
Jhalwa
Jhunsi
Naini
Phaphamau
Saidabad
Sulem Sarai

References

Neighbourhoods in Allahabad
Allahabad-related lists